FC Hirnyk Pavlohrad was a professional Ukrainian football club. The club was based in Pavlohrad, Ukraine.

History
Before 1985 the club carried name of Kolos. From 1986 to 1995 it played under name of Shakhtar. In 1994 merged with another amateur club Kosmos Pavlohrad under the name Shakhtar Pavlohrad. In 1995 it changed its name to Kosmos Pavlohrad.

In 1992, the team debuted in the Ukrainian Cup competitions.

In 1997, Hirnyk Pavlohrad advanced to the Ukrainian Second League, but finished at 15th place in 1997/98 season and again deprived of the status of a professional.

See also
 FC Kosmos Pavlohrad

Hirnyk Pavlohrad
Football clubs in Pavlohrad
Mining association football teams in Ukraine
Association football clubs established in 1978
Association football clubs disestablished in 1998
1978 establishments in Ukraine
1998 disestablishments in Ukraine